The 2021–22 Belmont Bruins women's basketball team represents Belmont University during the 2021–22 NCAA Division I women's basketball season. The Bruins, led by second year head coach Bart Brooks, play their home games at the Curb Event Center as members of the Ohio Valley Conference (OVC). They finished the season 23–8, 16–2 in OVC play win the OVC regular season. They won the OVC women's tournament by defeating Tennessee Tech and earns an automatic trip to the NCAA women's tournament where they upset Oregon in the first round before losing to Tennessee in the second round.

Roster

Schedule and results

|-
!colspan=9 style=| Non–conference regular season

|-
!colspan=9 style=| Ohio Valley Conference regular season

|-
!colspan=9 style=| Ohio Valley Conference tournament

|-
!colspan=9 style=| NCAA Women's Tournament

Rankings
2021–22 NCAA Division I women's basketball rankings

See also
2021–22 Belmont Bruins men's basketball team

References

Belmont Bruins women's basketball seasons
Belmont Bruins
Belmont
Belmont Bruins women's basketball
Belmont Bruins women's basketball